I Only Have Eyes for You is a 1937 Warner Bros. Merrie Melodies cartoon directed by Tex Avery. The short was released on February 27, 1937.

The title of this short is based on the song of the same name.

Plot
The protagonist (voiced by spoonerism specialist Joe Twerp), who drives an ice-delivery truck, is wooed by a homely spinster bird (voiced by Elvia Allman) who hopes to entice him with her culinary talents. The iceman, on the other hand, is only interested in Katie Canary (a Katharine Hepburn impression also voiced by Allman), who only wants to marry a radio crooner and rebuffs his overtures to the point where she prefers ordering a refrigerator.

The iceman, in order to win Katie, hires a voice imitator, Professor Mockingbird (voiced by Tedd Pierce), to simulate crooners from the back of his ice truck while the iceman lip-syncs. The scheme eventually backfires when Professor Mockingbird turns blue from the extreme cold in the ice truck, and gets sick to the point that he sneezes the top of the truck off, causing Katie to discover the iceman's ruse. Katie marries the Professor, being sufficiently impressed by his crooning ability (while replacing her radio with an electric refrigerator), while the iceman is finally won over by the spinster's cooking and baking and presumably marries her.

Notes
Through eBay auctions in 2007, the original titles have been found for the cartoon, but it is unknown if they have been acquired for future video releases.
This cartoon was re-released into the Blue Ribbon Merrie Melodies program on March 17, 1945.
This short was produced before Mel Blanc joined Warner Bros.' Termite Terrace studio. However, it was released after.
Working title: "I Only Have Ice for You"

References

External links

1937 animated films
1937 films
Films directed by Tex Avery
Merrie Melodies short films
Warner Bros. Cartoons animated short films
1930s Warner Bros. animated short films